...ish is a Big Finish Productions audio drama based on the long-running British science fiction television series Doctor Who.

Plot
The Sixth Doctor and Peri attend a conference of lexicographers at a college where an unfortunate murder has occurred. The victim was a perfectionist linguist compiling the galaxy's biggest dictionary, and also a personal friend of The Doctor, but the only suspect is her holographic assistant, named Book, who is also a repository for every word in the English language.

The Omniverbum is the mythical longest word in existence. According to records, no one who has found the Omniverbum, or its sentient affix "Ish", has lived to tell of it. Except one. Book found the Ish on an obscure world and accidentally brought back to the college as per his programming. But now it's escaped, and is out to cause havoc on the speech centers of the human brain unless The Doctor can stop it.

Peri is in a different kind of danger. Swiftly falling in with a so-called "word anarchist" named Warren, she might come face to face with the slowly degenerating Book, who is distraught and unhinged over his master's death by possibly his own hands. Distraught and unhinged enough to kill her....

Cast
The Doctor – Colin Baker
Peri – Nicola Bryant
Book – Moray Treadwell
Professor Osefa de Palabra Hftzbrn – Marie Collett
Symposiarch Cawdrey – Oliver Hume
Warren – Chris Eley

References

External links
Big Finish Productions – ...ish

Ish
Ish